Mehmed Karamehmedović (born 19 March 1944) is a former Bosnian-Herzegovinian footballer who played in several clubs in the Yugoslav First League.

Club career
Born in Trebinje, he started playing in a local club named Metalac, before moving to Leotar in 1963 where he played 3 seasons.  However, he will reach recognition during his stint with Velež where he became a regular central defender and where he played 3 seasons. In 1969 as an already established First League player, he moved to FK Vojvodina where, in the two seasons he stayed there, only missed 5 league matches.  He also played with Radnički Kragujevac between 1971 and 1973, and he finished his career playing with FK Iskra Stolac.

References

External sources
 

1944 births
Living people
People from Trebinje
Association football defenders
Yugoslav footballers
FK Leotar players
FK Velež Mostar players
FK Vojvodina players
FK Radnički 1923 players
Yugoslav First League players